Ulf Béla Timmermann (born 1 November 1962 in East Berlin) is a German former shot putter who broke the world record several times during the 1980s, and is the first and one of only four people to ever throw over 23 metres (along with Randy Barnes, Joe Kovacs and Ryan Crouser).

Timmermann was born in Berlin to an athletic family and took up shot put at 13. He broke his first world record in 1985 with a throw of 22.62 meters. On 22 May 1988 he became the first person to throw over 23 meters with a throw of 23.06 meters at Chania, Greece.

He won gold for East Germany at the 1988 Olympics in Seoul, ahead of Randy Barnes of the U.S.  The fourth place throw at this competition would have won every previous Olympics in the shot put. At the 1992 Olympics, he represented Germany, but finished a disappointing fifth. He left competition afterwards.

Timmermann is the farthest thrower of all time in the shot put using the glide technique. He also passed 22 metres in 16 different competitions. His coach was Werner Goldmann who is currently coaching shot put and discus throw in Berlin.

See also 
List of people from Berlin

References

 Article on Ulf Timmermann 

1962 births
Living people
Athletes from Berlin
People from East Berlin
East German male shot putters
German male shot putters
Olympic athletes of East Germany
Olympic gold medalists for East Germany
Olympic athletes of Germany
Athletes (track and field) at the 1988 Summer Olympics
Athletes (track and field) at the 1992 Summer Olympics
World record setters in athletics (track and field)
World Athletics Championships athletes for East Germany
World Athletics Championships medalists
European Athletics Championships medalists
Medalists at the 1988 Summer Olympics
Olympic gold medalists in athletics (track and field)
World Athletics Indoor Championships winners